Minnie Bodhanwala is an Indian business executive, entrepreneur and a dentist. She is the CEO of Nowrosjee Wadia Maternity Hospital and Bai Jerbai Wadia Hospital for Children in Mumbai. Bodhanwala is a board member and director of several Wadia Group organizations and companies. Her current appointment includes trustee of Sir Ness Wadia Foundation and advisor to the Chairman for CSR and Modern Education society.

Early life and education
Bodhanwala was born on 13 January 1963 in Bengaluru. She completed a Bachelor of Dental Surgery and an MBA. Her degrees include MHA, LLB, TQM, FCR, PGQMAHO, DPE (USA), DBA (USA). She holds a Master Black Belt Expert in Six Sigma. She started her career as a dentist with her own clinical practice in 1986, further she was appointed as Principal Dental Surgeon at Western Railway Hospital, Vadodara.

Board and positions
 Chief Executive Officer at Wadia Hospitals
 Director at Bombay Dyeing & Mfg. Co. Ltd
 Director at National Peroxide Pvt. Ltd.: Director
 Director at Bombay Burmah Trading Co. Ltd
 Wadia Group: CSR Advisor to Chairman
 Advisor at Hospital on Wheels – Impact India Foundation Medical
 Principal Assessor at  NABH
 Internal Counselor at Joint Commission International

Philanthropy
Bodhanwala is a member of the Impact India Foundation, where she has set up community projects in dental health for UNDP, UNICEF and WHO for their “Hospital-on-Wheels” project. She launched the Little Hearts Marathon to spread awareness for prevention of cardiac diseases among children. Bodhanwala is known for organising medical camps in the rural areas and education programmes for underprivileged women and children.

She set up a Human Milk Bank in the Bai Jerbai Wadia Hospital for Children hospital and a clinic for children suffering with multiple disabilities and vision impairment in Maharashtra.

Fellowships and affiliations
Fellowship in Clinical Research Medvarsity from Apollo Hospitals, Hyderabad
FisQuA - International Society for Quality in Health Care
Life Member of Academy of Hospital Administration, NOIDA
Member of Quality Council of India, Delhi

Achievements
Featured in India Forbes March 2019 as a “Globally Recognized Indian Business Leaders
Ranked 2nd Position among 25 legends of Healthcare Industry in India by Medicare Insight Magazine
Appointed as National Healthcare Council President and Voice of Healthcare Women Empowerment and Leadership

References

Living people
1963 births